Oruçlu may refer to:

Places

Azerbaijan
 Oruçlu, Kalbajar, a village in the Kalbajar Rayon
 Oruclu, Imishli, a village and municipality in the Imishli Rayon

Turkey
 Oruçlu, Artvin, a village in the central (Artvin) district of Artvin Province
 Oruçlu, Feke, a village in the district of Feke, Adana Province
 Oruçlu, Kozan, a village in the district of Kozan, Adana Province